Ceabhaigh is a small island in an arm of Loch Ròg on the west coast of Lewis in the Outer Hebrides of Scotland. It is not known if the island was ever permanently inhabited.

It lies in Loch Ròg nan Ear (West Loch Roag) between the mainland village of Breasclete and the larger island of Great Bernera and just north of Eilean Chearstaidh. The little skerry of Sgeir nan Cleibh lies just to the north.

Footnotes

Islands of Loch Ròg